7075 may refer to:

 7075 Sadovnichij, a main-belt asteroid discovered in 1979 
 7075 aluminium alloy